Lee Willerman (26 July 1939 – 10 January 1997) was an American psychologist known for his work on behavioral genetics using twin studies.

Biography
Willerman was born and grew up in Chicago. Willerman received BA and MA degrees from Roosevelt University in 1961 and 1964 respectively, and his Ph.D. from Wayne State University in 1967. After a three-year stint at the National Institutes of Health, Willerman completed a post-doctoral year at the University of Michigan in the Department of Human Genetics. In 1971 he took a position at the University of Texas at Austin, where he remained until his death.

In 1974, Willerman joined the American Eugenics Society, at a time when this society had already moved away from eugenics and towards the study of medical genetics, behavior genetics, and social biology. He also was an active member of the Behavior Genetics Association and his work over the remainder of his life involved behavior genetics. His first study examined IQ and birth weight differences between identical twins, finding that the twin who had been heavier at birth tended to be higher in IQ.
Willerman worked with Joseph M. Horn and John C. Loehlin on a major study of adoptive families, the Texas Adoption Project. Much of his work involved psychometrics and research into neuroanatomical predictors of intelligence.

In 1994 he was one of 52 signatories on "Mainstream Science on Intelligence," an editorial written by Linda Gottfredson and published in the Wall Street Journal, which claimed to represent academic consensus on issues related to intelligence research following the publication of the book The Bell Curve.

Bibliography

Books
 Psychology of Individual and Group Differences (1979) 
 Psychopathology, together with David B. Cohen (1989),

References

External links
Lee Willerman obituary via University of Texas at Austin

Behavior geneticists
1939 births
1997 deaths
Roosevelt University alumni
Wayne State University alumni
University of Michigan alumni
University of Texas at Austin faculty
20th-century American psychologists
20th-century American zoologists